Thoasia pterosmaragdos, the emerald-winged pentagonal arboreal carabid, is a species of beetle in the family Carabidae. It is found in French Guiana.

Description
They are macropterous and capable of flight. Standard body length is 4.21–4.39 mm. Elytra entirely metallic dark emerald shiny. Pronotum moderately narrow. Abdomen Sparsely setiferous.

References

Lebiinae
Beetles described in 2018